The Communist Collective of Catalonia (abbreviated CCC) was a political organization in Catalonia. It was formed in 1977 as a split from the Communist Organization of Spain (Bandera Roja) (OCE (BR)). Leaders of CCC included Joan Oms, Antoni Montserrat, Maria Olivares and Consol Casals. CCC published Quaderns de Debat.

History
The group contested the 1979 municipal elections with the candidature Comunistes de Catalunya ('Communists of Catalonia'), winning 14,529 votes (0,55% of the votes in Catalonia) but no seats. Most of the votes came from Barcelona Province, where the group got 13,145 votes (0,64%). In the Barcelona City municipal election the candidature got 6,148 votes (0.77%). In Badalona the group got 1,557 votes (1.82%). In Girona Province the group only contested the Girona municipal election, where it got 1,384 votes (3.78%). With 0.09% of the Spanish vote, Comunistes de Catalunya was the most voted party which failed to win a single councillor seat.

CCC took part in the National Liberation Left Bloc (BEAN) and in the founding of Left Nationalists (NE) in 1979.

References

Defunct communist parties in Catalonia
Political parties established in 1977
1977 establishments in Spain
Political parties disestablished in 1979
1979 disestablishments in Spain